Gracious Tide, Take Me Home is the debut studio album by British band Lanterns on the Lake. It was released in the UK on 19 September 2011 under Bella Union.

Track list

References

2011 albums
Bella Union albums
Lanterns on the Lake albums